Alen Ploj (born 30 June 1992) is a Slovenian footballer who plays as a forward for Lenart.

Club career
Ploj started his career at local side Lenart, and later played youth football with Jarenina. In 2007, he joined Maribor, where he signed his first professional contract with the club in early 2011. Ploj made his debut in the Slovenian PrvaLiga on 16 March 2011 against Nafta Lendava. During that season he made another league appearance for the club, in the final round of the 2010–11 Slovenian PrvaLiga season against Domžale, when he also scored his first top division goal. In the 2011–12 season, Ploj was loaned to the Slovenian Second League side Aluminij. He scored a hat-trick for Aluminij in the fourth matchday of the Second League on 27 August 2011, in a 5–1 win over Dravinja.

Personal life
Ploj is a native of Lenart, a small town in the northeastern Slovenia.

Honours
Maribor
Slovenian PrvaLiga: 2010–11, 2012–13, 2013–14
Slovenian Supercup: 2012, 2013

Aluminij
Slovenian Second League: 2011–12

Maribor B
Slovenian Third League: 2014–15

Notes

References

External links
NZS profile 

1992 births
Living people
People from the Municipality of Lenart
Slovenian footballers
Association football forwards
NK Maribor players
NK Aluminij players
ND Mura 05 players
NK Celje players
FC ViOn Zlaté Moravce players
GKS Bełchatów players
Wisła Puławy players
NK Nafta Lendava players
NK Drava Ptuj (2004) players
Slovenian PrvaLiga players
Slovak Super Liga players
I liga players
II liga players
Slovenian Second League players
Slovenian expatriate footballers
Slovenian expatriate sportspeople in Slovakia
Expatriate footballers in Slovakia
Slovenian expatriate sportspeople in Poland
Expatriate footballers in Poland
Slovenian expatriate sportspeople in Austria
Expatriate footballers in Austria
Slovenia youth international footballers
Slovenia under-21 international footballers